Chilcayoc (in Hispanicized spelling) or Ch'illkayuq (Quechua ch'illka baccharis, -yuq a suffix to indicate possession, "the one that has got baccharis" or "the one with baccharis") is the smallest of 11 districts of the Sucre Province in the Ayacucho region in Peru.

Population
The population of Chilcayoc is 677 people, 324 men and 353 women.

Ethnic groups 
The people in the district are mainly indigenous citizens of Quechua descent. Quechua is the language which the majority of the population (86.71%) learnt to speak in childhood, 13.13% of the residents started speaking using the Spanish language (2007 Peru Census).

Administrative division
The populated places in the district are:
 Ch'illkayuq (Chilcayoc)
 Patawasi (Patahuasi)
 Kawrakancha (Cabracancha)
 Wiqrupampa (Hueccropampa)
 Ankasilla (Anccasilla)
 Hatun Rumi (Jatun Rumi)
 Cañana
 Wamrani (Huambrani)
 Willkapampa (Vilcabamba)

References